Paddles (2016 – 7 November 2017) was a ginger and white polydactyl cat, owned by New Zealand Prime Minister Jacinda Ardern and her partner Clarke Gayford. Paddles had a profile on Twitter and in politics as "First Cat".

Early life
Paddles was a rescue cat, adopted by Ardern from a branch of the SPCA.

Career
She became a celebrity as the "First Cat" after Ardern took office, and a Twitter account was established in her name. Ardern said that she did not know who created the account. 

When U.S. President Donald Trump phoned Ardern to congratulate her for becoming Prime Minister in October 2017, Paddles interrupted the conversation.

Death
Paddles was run over by a car and killed in the Auckland suburb of Point Chevalier on 7 November 2017.

See also
 List of individual cats

References

2016 animal births
2017 animal deaths
Individual cats in politics
Animals on the Internet
Jacinda Ardern
Individual animals in New Zealand
2017 in New Zealand
Pets of world leaders